Freguesia is a neighborhood in the West Zone of the city of Rio de Janeiro, Brazil. In 2000, its estimated population was 54,010 inhabitants.

It is considered a middle-class area with many high class villas.

Neighbourhoods in Rio de Janeiro (city)